Matías Kabalin (born 26 October 1998) is an Argentine professional footballer who plays as a midfielder for Atenas.

Career
Kabalin's career began with Primera B Nacional's Santamarina. He was selected for his senior debut on 13 June 2017 for a Copa Argentina tie with Godoy Cruz, coming off the substitutes bench in a 3–0 defeat to the Argentine Primera División club. His league bow followed on 26 June against Chacarita Juniors, which was the first of six appearances in the 2016–17 campaign.

Personal life
Kabalin is the son of former professional footballer Mario Kabalín.

Career statistics
.

References

External links

1998 births
Living people
Argentine footballers
Argentine expatriate footballers
People from Tandil
Association football midfielders
Primera Nacional players
Club y Biblioteca Ramón Santamarina footballers
Atenas de San Carlos players
Sportspeople from Buenos Aires Province
Argentine expatriate sportspeople in Uruguay
Expatriate footballers in Uruguay